Thelma Marjorie Scott (17 June 1913 – 23 November 2006) was an Australian character actress  whose six-decade career in theatre, radio, film and Australian made her one of her country's most recognisable and beloved personalities. Having started her career in the early 1930s in theatre and film productions, she became one of the nation's biggest radio performers, during the 1940s featuring in productions such as Big Sister and Blue Hills. She returned to make TV films in the early late 1950s and then became a star on television after it was launched in Australia. She became best known for roles in soap operas including Number 96 as Claire Houghton and Mrs. Jennings in Richmond Hill.

Theatre 
Thelma Scott began her career in the theatre in 1931 at the age of 18, having joined the Gregan McMahon's Gregan McMahon Players. Her first professional acting role was as Ilona Szabo in McMahon's 1931 production of The Play's the Thing at Melbourne's Comedy Theatre. She followed this with roles in productions of Six Characters in Search of an Author, Too Good to Be True and Wind in the Rain. In 1932 she appeared with Coral Browne in the comedy Take Two from One. In 1933 they again acted together, this time in Children in Uniform for Efftee Players.

Film 
Scott appeared in many early Australia motion pictures starting in the early 1930s, until 1949, although in non-starring roles, with the exception of Sons of Matthew. She debuted in her first film in 1931, The Haunted Barn, a short produced by Efftee Studios and directed by Gregan McMahon. Following this came roles in feature films Diggers in Blighty and Harmony Row starring popular comedian George Wallace. The films premiered as a double bill in Melbourne in February 1933. Almost a year later, she and Wallace appeared together in the film A Ticket in Tatts.

Radio 
During this period Scott also acted in radio plays, and she continued her theatre work. She was critically acclaimed in her 1934 performance as Tessa in the play The Constant Nymph. Based on this, she was offered a six-year contract with J. C. Williamson's theatre company, with the intention of grooming her for musical comedy. Scott chose to move in the direction of drama, opting for a role in the thriller Ten Minute Alibi, which had a successful run, touring Sydney and Melbourne. She subsequently signed with radio 2CH, emerging as one of Australia's biggest radio stars. She attracted both popular and critical praise for her work in the medium, and acted in countless radio productions throughout the 1940s. Her radio work included runs in two ongoing radio soap operas. The first, Big Sister, in which she starred as Ruth Evans, aired nationally for five years from 1942. After it ended, she acted in the serial Crossroads of Life. She won the Macquarie Award in 1947 and, in 1949, again acted on film, playing family matriarch Jane O'Riordan in Charles Chauvel's epic Sons of Matthew.

Touring England 
In 1951 she travelled to London, where she was later joined by her former Sydney housemate, actress Gwen Plumb. Scott acted on the London stage, appearing in An Evening with Beatrice Lillie at the Globe Theatre, replacing the departed Constance Carpenter. Scott also did her first television work in the UK, working on a BBC comedy series and hosting her own show, How to Manage Men.

Television acting and directing 
She returned to Australia in 1957, where her acting career continued on television. She acted in the early soap opera The Story of Peter Grey (1961), the role of Lady Mayoress in the 1965 ABC science fiction series The Stranger followed by appearances in the rural serial Bellbird and guest roles in Skippy the Bush Kangaroo and Delta.

Scott also worked as a director on the opening night show of Channel Ten Sydney in 1965, titled TV Spells Magic, and did a stint as director on the daily chat show The Gwen Plumb Show. She continued to act in the theatre, performing with Ray Milland in Hostile Witness at Sydney's Tivoli Theatre in 1967, and in 1968 acted in J.C. Williamson's production of Spring and Port Wine, playing Daisy Crompton opposite Alfred Marks.

Following this came the role of imperious Point Piper socialite Claire Houghton, the mother of Abigail's character in the television soap opera Number 96 starting in 1972. The role of Claire had been devised by the show's creator David Sale specifically for Thelma Scott. Claire became a popular recurring character in the serial, initially despairing at the "shabby" apartment block Number 96 that her daughter Bev Houghton chose to live in. She soon befriended other residents such as Don (Joe Hasham) and Vera (Elaine Lee), and formed business associations with Jack (Tom Oliver) and Maggie (Bettina Welch). These associations sustained Claire's continued role in the series after the death of Bev in January 1974, and formed the basis for her inclusion in the feature film version of the series released in 1974. Though Claire's appearances diminished in the serial's middle years, she was relaunched into the show for its final few months, and was central to several key storylines during the 1977 episodes. Serena, a small black poodle owned by the actress, sometimes appeared as Claire's pet, Serena, in these final episodes. Claire's signature phrase in the series was "Allow me to be the best judge of that".

After Number 96 ended in 1977 Scott continued to act on Australian television, making a guest appearance in Glenview High (1977), and sustaining a role in the medical serial The Young Doctors in 1980. She later played the recurring role of Mrs. Jennings in the soap opera Richmond Hill in 1988.

Personal life 
Thelma Scott was a lifelong partner of Gwen Plumb. For many years she and Plumb lived in Kirribilli, New South Wales. They also had a house at Whale Beach where they hosted luncheons for show business colleagues. Plumb died on 5 June 2002. Four-and-a-half years later, Thelma Scott died of a heart attack at the Royal North Shore Hospital, in Sydney. She was 93 years old, a fact noted by all the obituary writers who referred to her as the 'grand dame' of Australian actors

Filmography

Films

Telemovies and series

Selected theatre and radio productions

References

External links 

1913 births
2006 deaths
Australian stage actresses
Australian television actresses
Australian television directors
Actresses from Melbourne
Actresses from Sydney
Australian LGBT actors
LGBT television directors
Australian radio actresses
Australian film actresses
20th-century LGBT people
Australian women television directors